José Manuel Flores Moreno (born 6 March 1987), commonly known as Chico, is a Spanish former professional footballer who played as a central defender.

Club career

Early years and Almería
Born in Cádiz, Andalusia, Chico started playing professionally with hometown club Cádiz CF, first with its reserves. In the 2006–07 season, with the main squad in Segunda División, he appeared in three league games.

Chico served two loans in 2007–08, first at Racing Club Portuense then with FC Barcelona Atlètic, helping the Catalans to win promotion to Segunda División B after arriving at the request of manager Pep Guardiola. At the end of the campaign, he signed with Cádiz neighbours UD Almería in La Liga.

In 2009–10, Chico contributed 27 appearances as the team again retained their top-flight status after finishing in 13th position. He also spent more than one month on the sidelines, due to leg ailments.

Genoa
Chico signed with Genoa C.F.C. in late July 2010 after extensive negotiations, for five years and €4 million. He took part in less than half of the Serie A matches in his first and only season.

On 22 July 2011, RCD Mallorca reached an agreement with the Italians to take Chico on a season-long loan, with the Balearic Islands club having an option to buy the player at the end of the campaign. He totalled 2,884 minutes of action as either a right or centre-back, starting in all his appearances for an eventual eighth-place finish.

Swansea City
On 10 July 2012, Chico signed for Premier League side Swansea City for £2 million on a three-year contract, rejoining former Mallorca boss Michael Laudrup in the process. He made his league debut on 18 August, playing the full 90 minutes in a 5–0 away win against Queens Park Rangers at Loftus Road.

Chico was given a straight red card after 71 minutes of the 2–2 home draw against Sunderland 1 September 2012, for a challenge on Louis Saha – referee Roger East decided it was too high and sent him off for dangerous play. An injury prevented him from playing in his team's victory in the League Cup and, on 6 April 2013, he agreed to an extension meant to keep him at the Liberty Stadium until June 2016.

In January 2014, police were called to Swansea's training ground after Chico allegedly picked up a brick in a furious row with team-mate Garry Monk. On 1 February, he was accused of diving in a game against West Ham United, where he went down under contact from Andy Carroll, who was subsequently sent off by Howard Webb.

Lekhwiya
On 9 August 2014, Lekhwiya SC announced the signing of Chico who had arrived to Doha two days earlier for the pertinent medical. He reunited with former Swansea manager Michael Laudrup, and scored in his Qatar Stars League debut for his new club, a 5–0 victory over Qatar SC in the first match of the season.

Later career
In September 2017, free agent Chico returned to Spain and signed for Granada CF ahead of the second level campaign. On 28 June 2018 he moved abroad again, joining FC Rubin Kazan of the Russian Premier League on a two-year contract but leaving in February 2019 by mutual consent.

On 16 July 2019, Chico agreed to a one-year deal with CF Fuenlabrada, newly promoted to the second tier.

International career
On 14 October 2008, Chico made his debut for the Spain under-21 team, playing the entire 3–1 extra time win against Switzerland for the 2009 UEFA European Championship qualifiers. He was called for the squad that appeared in the finals in Sweden, participating in the 0–0 group stage draw with Germany.

Club statistics

Honours
Swansea City
Football League Cup: 2012–13

Lekhwiya
Qatar Stars League: 2014–15, 2016–17
Qatari Super Cup: 2015, 2016
Qatar Crown Prince Cup: 2015
Qatar Emir Cup: 2016

References

External links

Stats and bio at Cadistas1910 

1987 births
Living people
Spanish footballers
Footballers from Cádiz
Association football defenders
La Liga players
Segunda División players
Segunda División B players
Tercera División players
Cádiz CF B players
Cádiz CF players
Racing Club Portuense players
FC Barcelona Atlètic players
UD Almería players
RCD Mallorca players
Granada CF footballers
CF Fuenlabrada footballers
Serie A players
Genoa C.F.C. players
Premier League players
Swansea City A.F.C. players
Qatar Stars League players
Lekhwiya SC players
Russian Premier League players
FC Rubin Kazan players
Spain under-21 international footballers
Spanish expatriate footballers
Expatriate footballers in Italy
Expatriate footballers in Wales
Expatriate footballers in Qatar
Expatriate footballers in Russia
Spanish expatriate sportspeople in Italy
Spanish expatriate sportspeople in Wales
Spanish expatriate sportspeople in Qatar
Spanish expatriate sportspeople in Russia